Xylota annulifera , (Bigot, 1884), the  Longspine Leafwalker , is an uncommon species of syrphid fly observed across Canada and in the eastern United States. Syrphid flies are also known as Hover Flies or Flower Flies because the adults are frequently found hovering around flowers from which they feed on nectar and pollen. The larvae of this genus live under bark in sap runs.

Distribution
Canada, United States.

References

Eristalinae
Insects described in 1884
Diptera of North America
Hoverflies of North America
Taxa named by Jacques-Marie-Frangile Bigot